Sig Mejdal (born December 31, 1965) is an American assistant manager, and sabermetrics analyst for the Baltimore Orioles  and a former NASA engineer. He previously helped the St. Louis Cardinals make draft picks. Mejdal turned his personal interest in baseball into a career after being inspired by Moneyball in 2003. Played goalie for the Chesterfield Kings.

Biography
Sig Mejdal grew up in San Jose, California. His mother was a nurse and his father was a career army officer. In his youth, Mejdal played little league baseball for six years. He was a fan of the Oakland A's and a member of the Society for American Baseball Research. According to UC Davis magazine, Sig Mejdal was "fascinated with the stats on the backs of baseball cards." Mejdal graduated from University of California, Davis with bachelor's degrees in mechanical engineering and aeronautical engineering. He later earned master's degrees in operations research and cognitive psychology from San Jose State University. While attending college in the late 1980s, he worked as a blackjack dealer at High Sierra in Lake Tahoe.

After graduating from UC Davis in 1989, Mejdal worked for Lockheed Martin's satellite operations unit at the Onizuka Air Force Station. Mejdal's interest in baseball was recreational until 2003, when Moneyball inspired him to consider pursuing a career in sabermetrics. He attended the Winter Meetings in search for a job in baseball, but ended up working for NASA as a biomathematician in the Fatigue Countermeasures Group. Mejdal studied sleep patterns of astronauts on the International Space Station in order to optimize their sleep schedules.

While working for NASA, Mejdal had a side job as the chief quantitative analyst for Sam Walker's fantasy baseball team Streetwalkers Baseball Club, which was participating in the Tout Wars competition's "Battle of the Experts." The fantasy team would later become the subject of Walker's book: Fantasyland: A Sportswriter's Obsessive Bid to Win the World's Most Ruthless Fantasy Baseball.

In 2005, Sig Mejdal was recruited to do sabermetrics for the St. Louis Cardinals' new analytics department. He took 22 months of data from college baseball games and ran it through an algorithm to determine the likely performance and stats baseball players would achieve. According to Sports Illustrated, "[o]ver the next seven seasons the Cardinals would draft more players who became big leaguers than any other organization." He was promoted to senior quantitative analyst in 2008 and director of amateur draft analysis in January 2011. Mejdal created a formula to predict the risk of injury to baseball players and contributed a section on injury probability to The Bill James Handbook.

In 2012, Mejdal became the Director of Decision Sciences for the Houston Astros, where he supported recruitment decisions based on physical tests and historical player performance. Hiring Mejdal to apply an analytics-based decision tree on their player choices was part of the effort to revitalize the team and address performance issues in prior seasons. He helped the team create the STOUT system, named after the combination of "stat" and "scout," for making player choices. The system was criticized for de-humanizing players, but after trading off some players and making new recruits, the Astro's farm system became ranked among the best in baseball. The Astros also used analytics to persuade players that were uncomfortable with non-traditional positions on the field to embrace shifts, which the team now uses very heavily.

In 2015, Mejdal was one of the team's advisers whose login credentials were believed to have been used to hack into the team's database.

When Mike Elias was hired from the Astros as general manager of the Baltimore Orioles, Elias hired Mejdal as his assistant general manager.

Bibliography

Further reading

References

1965 births
Living people
People from San Jose, California
San Jose State University alumni
University of California, Davis alumni
Baseball statisticians
NASA people
St. Louis Cardinals executives
Houston Astros executives
Baltimore Orioles executives